Faculty of Occupational Medicine may refer to:
Faculty of Occupational Medicine (Ireland), a division of the Royal College of Physicians of Ireland 
Faculty of Occupational Medicine (United Kingdom)